The Patriotic League was the first paramilitary unit of Territorial Defence Force of the Republic of Bosnia and Herzegovina (TORBiH).

History
On 19 December 1990 Alija Izetbegović and the SDA party discussed forming an independent paramilitary separate from the Yugoslav People's Army. In March 1991 Sefer Halilović formed the Patriotic League (Patriotska Liga - PL) as an independent Bosnian army, with the same territorial organization as Territorial Defense Forces (TO). Later on the Patriotic League was connected to the TO. The Patriotic League, alongside the TORBiH, would later become the Army of the Republic of Bosnia and Herzegovina.

Training
The Patriotic League received training at Croatian Special Police centers and by March 1992 claimed 98,000 troops – more than the shrinking TO – organized in 9 regions and 103 (out of 109) districts.

Units
Crni Labudovi (The Black Swans)
Armija RBiH - Diverzantsko-Izviđačka Brigada
Zmaj od Bosne (Dragon of Bosnia)

References

External links
YouTube video

Military units and formations of the Army of the Republic of Bosnia and Herzegovina
Paramilitary organizations in the Yugoslav Wars
1990 establishments in Bosnia and Herzegovina
Military units and formations established in 1991
Military units and formations disestablished in 1992
1992 disestablishments in Bosnia and Herzegovina